Rafael Martínez Aguilera (born 3 March 1982), known as Rafa Martínez,  is a Spanish professional basketball player for Baxi Manresa of the Liga ACB. He also represented the Spain national team internationally. He plays the shooting guard position.

Professional career
Rafa Martínez started playing basketball for Basquet Manresa eventually rising from the club's junior team ranks. The team previously played in the Spanish second division LEB but was promoted to the ACB for the 1999–2000 season where on October 9, 1999, he made his professional debut in the top Spanish league against FC Barcelona. The following season he spent in the Basketball team CB Vic. After spending two years in the Valls Felix Hotel in LEB-2, he returned to the Basquet Manresa in 2003.

In 2008, Martínez joined Valencia Basket. He won the EuroCup in the 2009–10. Along with that, Martínez had the highest three-point percentage in the Liga ACB that season.  In the 2013–14 season, he won the Eurocup for the second time.

On 14 March 2017 Martínez became the all-time three-point field goals leader of the EuroCup after passing Marko Popović with 208 three-pointers.

First all-time pointer of valencia basket since 26 February 2019 in the match against San Pablo Burgos team, surpassing Brad Branson.

On July 10, 2019, Martínez signed with RETAbet Bilbao Basket of the Liga ACB.

On July 8, 2020, Martínez had signed with Baxi Manresa of the Liga ACB. On July 15, 2021, Baxi Manresa announced that Martínez would play one more season for the club.

Spain national team
He has been with the Spain national team from the youth level. With the U-20 he won the silver medal at the U-20 European Basketball Championship 2002 played in Vilnius (Lithuania), and won the bronze medal with the B-team at the Mediterranean Games 2005 played in Almería (Spain).

In June 2010 he was included on the list of 24 candidates for the Spain national team, but did not make the final 12-man roster for 2010 FIBA World Championship.

Career statistics

EuroLeague

|-
| style="text-align:left;"| 2010–11
| style="text-align:left;"| Valencia Basket
| 21 || 21 || 29.0 || .416 || .375 || .769 || 2.1 || 1.5 || .8 || .0 || 10.7 || 8.4
|- class="sortbottom"
| style="text-align:left;"| 2014–15
| style="text-align:left;"| Valencia
| 10 || 6 || 13.1 || .242 || .136 || .714 || .8 || .7 || .5 || .0 || 2.4 || 1.0
|- class="sortbottom"
| colspan="2" style="text-align:center;"| Career
| 31 || 27 || 23.9 || .388 || .331 || .763 || 1.7 || 1.3 || .7 || .0 || 8.0 || 6.0

References

External links

 Rafa Martínez  at acb.com 
 Rafa Martínez at draftexpress.com
 Rafa Martínez at eurobasket.com
 Rafa Martínez at euroleague.net

1982 births
Living people
Bàsquet Manresa players
Bilbao Basket players
CB Vic players
Competitors at the 2005 Mediterranean Games
Liga ACB players
Mediterranean Games bronze medalists for Spain
Mediterranean Games medalists in basketball
Shooting guards
Spanish men's basketball players
Basketball players from Barcelona
Valencia Basket players